Ali Khan-e Zaman (also Romanized as ʿAlī Khān-e Zamān; also known as ‘Alīkhān-e Zamān and Deh-e ‘Alīkhān-e Zamān) is a village in Qorqori Rural District, Qorqori District, Hirmand County, Sistan and Baluchestan Province, Iran. At the 2006 census, its population was 222, in 50 families.

References 

Populated places in Hirmand County